In descriptive set theory, a lightface analytic game is a game whose payoff set A is a  subset of Baire space; that is, there is a tree T on  which is a computable subset of , such that A is the projection of the set of all branches of T.

The determinacy of all lightface analytic games is  equivalent to the existence of 0#.

Effective descriptive set theory
Determinacy